Ver or Voviyo are songs sung during the pre-marriage ceremony known as Ros in Goa, India.

See also
 Deknni
 Mando
 Fugdi

References

External links

Goan music